Alexandre-Maurice Delisle (1810 – February 13, 1880) was a Quebec businessman and political figure.

He was born in Montreal, Lower Canada in 1810, studied at the Petit Séminaire de Montréal, articled in law and was admitted to the bar in 1832. In 1833, he married Marie-Angélique, daughter of Augustin Cuvillier, and was named clerk of the peace and clerk of the crown at Montreal. Delisle was elected to the Legislative Assembly of the Province of Canada for Montreal County in 1841. He resigned in 1843 to accept the post of clerk of the crown. He speculated in land and also served as a director and later the president for the Montreal City and District Savings Bank. He helped promote the Montreal and Bytown Railway and also served as its president. Delisle also served as director and later president for the Champlain and St. Lawrence Railway; he was also a director of the Gulf of St. Lawrence Steamship Company. In 1859, he was named harbour commissioner. He was named sheriff in 1862. In 1863, he was accused of fraud during his term as clerk of the crown. When these claims were supported by the testimony of a number of witnesses, all Liberals, he was relieved of his posts. When the Conservatives regained power in 1866, he was reinstated to the harbour commission and also given the post of customs collector at Montreal and held these offices until the Liberals returned to power in 1874.

He died at Montreal in 1880 and was buried in the Notre Dame des Neiges Cemetery.

External links
 

1810 births
1880 deaths
Members of the Legislative Assembly of the Province of Canada from Canada East
Burials at Notre Dame des Neiges Cemetery